Górnik Wieliczka is a Polish football club based in Wieliczka, Lesser Poland Voivodeship. Górnik currently plays in the regional league. 

Founded in 1947 by the initiative of a group of salt mine workers. The first president of the club was Józef Kuszowski. The club's best league performance was its 5th place at the 2008–09 II liga season (the club withdrew after the end of the season but kept their position in the final table).

See also 
 Football in Poland

References

External links
 Official website
 Górnik Wieliczka at the 90minut.pl website

 
Association football clubs established in 1947
1947 establishments in Poland
Wieliczka County
Mining association football clubs in Poland